The following is a list of episodes of South Korean variety game show television series X-Man. It was broadcast on SBS from November 8, 2003 to April 8, 2007, with a total of 178 episodes were aired.

X-Man

Real Situation Saturday 
Aired: November 8, 2003 - October 9, 2004

Good Sunday 
Aired: October 10, 2004 - October 29, 2006

New X-Man 
Aired: November 5, 2006 - April 8, 2007

References

External links 
 X-Man Official Homepage 
 New X-Man Official Homepage 

Lists of variety television series episodes
Lists of South Korean television series episodes